Muckle Green Holm is an uninhabited island in the North Isles of the Orkney archipelago in Scotland.

Name

'Muckle' is Scots for 'big' or 'large'; 'holm' is from the Old Norse holmr, a small and rounded islet.

Geography

To the south lies Little Green Holm, and between the two is the Sound of Green Holms. Eastward is a strait called Fall of Warness between Muckle Green Holm and the much larger island of Eday.

Muckle Green Holm has a great cormorant colony and a population of European otters.

Tidal power

The Fall of Warness has strong tidal currents suitable for tidal power.

Starting in 2007, the European Marine Energy Centre installed tidal power testing equipment.

In 2021, Orbital Marine Power installed a tidal turbine called Orbital O2 that supplies 2MW to the electrical grid.

See also
List of Orkney islands

Notes and references

External links

Uninhabited islands of Orkney